Hard X-ray Modulation Telescope (HXMT) also known as Insight is a Chinese X-ray space observatory, launched on June 15, 2017 to observe black holes, neutron stars, active galactic nuclei and other phenomena based on their X-ray and gamma-ray emissions. It is based on the JianBing 3 imagery reconnaissance satellite series platform.

The project, a joint collaboration of the  Ministry of Science and Technology of China, the Chinese Academy of Sciences, and Tsinghua University, has been under development since 2000.

Payload 
The main scientific instrument is an array of 18  NaI(Tl)/CsI(na) slat-collimated "phoswich" scintillation detectors, collimated to 5.7°×1° overlapping fields of view.
The main NaI detectors have an area of 286 cm2 each, and cover the 20–200 keV energy range.
Data analysis is planned to be by a direct algebraic method, "direct demodulation", which has shown promise in de-convolving the raw data into images while preserving excellent angular and energy resolution.

The satellite has three payloads, the high energy X-ray Telescope (20–250 keV), the medium energy X-ray telescope (5–30 keV), and the low energy X-ray telescope (1–15 keV)

See also
 X-ray astronomy
 X-ray astronomy satellite

References 

Space telescopes
X-ray telescopes
Chinese telescopes
2017 in China
Spacecraft launched in 2017
Satellites of China
Spacecraft launched by Long March rockets